Tham Luang Nang Non is a karstic cave system in the Tham Luang–Khun Nam Nang Non Forest Park, near the village of Pong Pha, in northern Thailand. It lies beneath Doi Nang Non, a mountain range on the border with Myanmar.

On 2 July 2018, the cave was brought to international prominence when twelve members of a junior association football team and their assistant coach were found deep inside the cave. They had become trapped due to monsoonal flooding on 23 June. A rescue effort succeeded in bringing them out safely by 10 July. Two Thai rescue divers died as a result of the rescue.

Description

Name
The cave is also known as Tham Luang, Tham Nam Cham, and Tham Yai. Since tham means 'cave', the commonly used phrase Tham Luang cave is a tautology.

Geology

It has many deep recesses, narrow tunnels, boulder chokes, collapses, and sumps. Stalactites and stalagmites are found throughout the cave. There is a permanent stream inside the cave, which enters from the west, flows with the passage for several metres, and exits via the eastern wall. A team of French cavers made the first survey of Tham Luang's main cave in 1986 and 1987. Further surveys were done in 2014 and 2015 by the British cavers Vern Unsworth, Martin Ellis, Phil Collett, and Rob Harper.

Tourism
A visitor centre outside the main entrance has a detailed map of the cave. There is a car park nearby.
The first  of the cave is open to the public for guided tours between November and April. The cave floods during rainy season and is closed to visitors.

2018 cave rescue

In 2018, twelve boys aged 11 to 16, all members of a junior association football team, and their 25-year-old male assistant coach were stranded in the cave for 18 days by a flood. They were rescued in a massive joint operation between the Thai government, the Thai military, and a group of international expert cave divers. The effort to save their lives was a global operation watched around the world. In all, 90 divers – 50 of whom were foreigners – helped to extract the group. An ex-navy diver, Saman Kunan, died during the mission because he ran out of air, having placed air tanks along the route for the boys. Another diver and ex-Navy Seal died a few months later from an infection he contracted during the cave rescue.

References

Further reading

Caves of Thailand
Geography of Chiang Rai province
Tourist attractions in Chiang Rai province
Tham Luang cave rescue